Associazione Calcio Fiorentina did not manage to repeat its near-miss season from 1998–99, and instead missed out on qualification to the Champions League, following an inconsistent season. Its topscorer Gabriel Batistuta finally gave up on clinching the Serie A title with Fiorentina, and switched to Roma in the summer, a move which was greeted with controversy since Roma had only finished sixth in the 1999–2000 season.

Fiorentina came close to advancing to the quarter-finals of the Champions League, but ultimately a draw at home against Bordeaux ensured that home wins against Manchester United and Valencia were not enough.

Players

Transfers

Competitions

Serie A

League table

Results summary

Results by round

Matches

Coppa Italia

Round of 16

Quarter-finals

UEFA Champions League

Third qualifying round

Group stage

Second group stage

Statistics

Appearances and goals

Goalscorers
  Gabriel Batistuta 23
  Enrico Chiesa 7
  Rui Costa 4
  Abel Balbo 3

References

ACF Fiorentina seasons
Fiorentina